Pathumthani University Football Club (Thai), is a Thai professional football club under the stewardship of Pathumthani University based in Ayutthaya. The club was founded in 2012. The club is currently playing in the Thai League 3 Western region.

Stadium and locations

Season by season record

Players

Current squad

Coaching staff

References

 https://archive.today/20150128084236/http://www.smmonline.net/m/smmsport/news.php?n=140943

External links
 

Association football clubs established in 2012
Football clubs in Thailand
Sport in Bangkok
2012 establishments in Thailand
University and college association football clubs